"A Working Man Can't Get Nowhere Today" is a song written and recorded by American country music artist Merle Haggard and The Strangers. It was released in August 1977 as the lead single from the album of the same name, A Working Man Can't Get Nowhere Today. The song peaked at number 16 on the U.S. country singles chart and at number 8 on the Canadian country singles chart.

Personnel
 Merle Haggard– vocals, guitar

The Strangers:
Roy Nichols – lead guitar
Norman Hamlet – steel guitar, dobro
 Tiny Moore – mandolin
 Ronnie Reno – guitar
 Mark Yeary – piano
 James Tittle – bass
Biff Adam – drums
Don Markham – saxophone

Chart performance

References

1977 singles
Merle Haggard songs
Songs written by Merle Haggard
Song recordings produced by Ken Nelson (American record producer)
MCA Records singles
1977 songs